The twelve Earthly Branches or Terrestrial Branches are a Chinese ordering system used throughout East Asia in various contexts, including its ancient dating system, astrological traditions, zodiac and ordinals.

Origin
This system was built from observations of the orbit of Jupiter. Chinese astronomers divided the celestial circle into 12 sections to follow the orbit of  Suìxīng (Jupiter, the Year Star). Astronomers rounded the orbit of Suixing to 12 years (from 11.86). Suixing was associated with  Shètí (η Boötis) and sometimes called Sheti.

Jonathan Smith has proposed that the first meanings of the earthly branches, predating the Shang dynasty, were phases of the moon, with the heavenly stems at that point referring to divisions of the ecliptic.  After being adopted as a calendar these would have lost their clear lunar reference, permitting their repurposing for Jupiter stations.

History

In correlative thinking, the 12 years of the Jupiter cycle also identify the 12 months of the year, 12 animals (mnemonics for the system), cardinal directions, seasons, and the 12 traditional Chinese units of time in the form of  periods that each day was divided into. In this case an Earthly Branch can refer to a whole  period, or to the exact time at its center. For instance  wǔshí can mean either  noon or 11am1pm. (The jiéqì system provided single hours and 15-degree arcs in time and space.)

Chinese seasons are based on observations of the sun and stars. Many Chinese calendrical systems have started the new year on the second new moon after the winter solstice.

The Earthly Branches are today used with the Heavenly Stems in the current version of the "traditional Chinese calendar" and in Taoism. The Ganzhi (Stem-Branch) combination is a fairly new way to mark time; in the second millennium BC, during the Shang era, the 10 Heavenly Stems provided the names of the days of the week. The Branches are as old as the Stems (and according to recent archaeology may actually be older), but the Stems were tied to the ritual calendars of Chinese kings.

Twelve branches

Some cultures assign different animals: Vietnam replaces the Ox and Rabbit with the water buffalo and cat, respectively; Tibet replaces the Rooster with the bird. In the traditional Kazakh version of the 12 year animal cycle (müşel), the Dragon is substituted by a snail (ulw), and the Tiger appears as a leopard (barıs).

Directions

Though Chinese has words for the four cardinal directions, Chinese mariners and astronomers/astrologers preferred using the 12 directions of the Earthly Branches, which is somewhat similar to the modern-day practice of English-speaking pilots using o'clock for directions. Since 12 points were not enough for sailing, 12 midpoints were added. Instead of combining two adjacent direction names, they assigned new names:

 For the four diagonal directions, appropriate trigram names of I Ching were used.
 For the rest, the Heavenly Stems (1–4, 7–10) were used. Thus, they were assigned clockwise to the two adjacent points of the east.

The 24 directions are:

Advanced mariners such as Zheng He used 48-point compasses.

Current usage
The terrestrial branches are still commonly used nowadays in Chinese counting systems similar to the way the alphabet is used in English. For example, names in legal documents and contracts where English speakers would use K, L, M, etc. Korea and Japan also use terrestrial branches on legal documents in this way.

Since the celestial stems and terrestrial branches combined only consist of 22 characters, the four final letters – W, X, Y, and Z – cannot be represented by any of the celestial stems and terrestrial branches, and those four letters are represented by ‘物’, ‘天’, ‘地’, and ‘人’, respectively, instead.

In case of upper-case letters, the radical of ‘口’ (the ‘mouth’ radical) may be added to the corresponding terrestrial branch or any of ‘物’, ‘天’, ‘地’, and ‘人’ to denote an upper-case letter.

See also

Heavenly Stems (天干)
Sexagesimal cycle (干支)
Sheng Xiao
Chinese calendar

References

External links

 

Technical factors of Chinese astrology
Jupiter (mythology)
Eastern esotericism